Muricella is a genus of corals belonging to the family Acanthogorgiidae.

The species of this genus are found in Pacific and Indian Ocean, Caribbean.

Species

Species:

Muricella abnormalis 
Muricella argentea 
Muricella aruensis

References

Octocorallia genera
Acanthogorgiidae